The Church of Jesus Christ of Latter-day Saints (LDS Church) has had a presence in India since the 19th century. As of 2019, there were local members, missionaries and multiple meetinghouses of the LDS Church in the country.

History
Joseph Richards first introduced the faith to India in 1851, when he arrived in Calcutta. There was a small branch organized in Calcutta, but most of the members migrated to USA. As per the church's policy, all members were invited to gather in one place. The main reason was to build the church and strengthen the priesthood leadership. Though many members of the branch migrated to the US, a small group of members continued to have meetings in Calcutta. The branch still exists in Calcutta today.

In the church's history in India, there were early missionaries who visited Madras (now known as Chennai), Bombay (now known as Mumbai), and other places in India who taught the gospel.  In fact there were missionaries visiting Taj Mahal in Agra, India and teaching the tourists which was filmed in one of the videos, "The Ancient America Speaks," produced by the church in 1974. There were many events in church history in Coimbatore, Tamil Nadu, India. The golden history started in 1963 at Coimbatore. This was revealed by John Aki, then president of the Hong Kong China Temple during the year 2011. Some of the first families were sealed in the Hong Kong China Temple by Anthony D. Perkins, a general authority who was the president of the church's Asia Area at that time. Perkins anticipated that church membership in that part of India would grow. The movement increased in India by 1993, when Mormon missionaries began proselytizing in Bangalore.

By the beginning of 2000, there were 2,435 members in four districts and eighteen branches, and in 2005 there were 5,951. By 2013, there were about 10,000 members of the LDS Church in India.

During the church's April 2018 general conference, church president Russell M. Nelson announced that a temple would be built in Bengaluru, India. This was one of seven new temples announced at the time, and the first to be built in India.

On December 2, 2020, ground was broken to signify the beginning of construction of the Bengaluru India Temple by Robert K. William, a native of India serving as an area seventy.

Stakes & districts

As of February 2023, the following stakes and districts were located in India:

In addition to these stakes & districts, branches with meetinghouses that are not part of a stake or district are located in Goa, Kolkata and Mumbai and are part of the India New Delhi Mission. The India South Branch (Located in the India Bengaluru Mission) and the India New Delhi Mission Branch serves individuals and families not in proximity to a church meetinghouse.

Missions

Temples

See also

 Christianity in India

References

Additional reading
.

External links
 The Church of Jesus Christ of Latter-day Saints in India Official site
 LDS Church - India Newsroom
 ComeUntoChrist.org Latter-day Saints Visitor site

Christian denominations in India